Yugendran (born Yugendran Vasudevan on 20 December 1976) is an Indian actor and singer who has sung hundreds of songs in Tamil, Telugu and Malayalam. He is also an occasional music director and host.

Personal life 
Yugendran is the son of the late Malaysian origin Tamil language playback singer-actor Malaysia Vasudevan. He has two sisters named Pavithra and Prashanthini. Prashanthini is a Tamil playback singer as well and has sung in films such as 12B, Veyil and Vaaranam Aayiram.

Yugendran performed in the Launch of a Tamil radio station in Sri Lanka called Swarna Oli in 1999, where he met his wife, Hayma Malini, a popular RJ host. His wife Hayma Malini who was born and raised in Singapore, holds an Singapore citizenship. Together they have three children, Visashan Naarayan, Kishan Kutty Naarayan and Darshan Naarayan Nair. He, his wife and children had previously resided in India, Malaysia and Singapore. They currently reside in Auckland, New Zealand and runs his own events company Rambutan Media Works NZ Limited.

Music career 
Yugendran started out in the music industry as a Mridangamist and made his debut solo performance at the age of 10. His mridangam arangetram had Dr. Balamurali Krishna accompanying him on the viola and was attended by Illaiyaraja himself. His first song was for the movie Uzhavan Magan, "Senthoorave poove", where he sang the shepherd boy's voice. He went on to sing in stage shows with his father in India as well as overseas. Till the age of 14, he used to sing the female portion of the duets his father rendered on stage. After his voice broke, he went on to do solo performances in countries such as Switzerland, Sri Lanka, Singapore, Malaysia and America, even before becoming a playback singer.

Yugendran's debut as a playback singer was with the song "Pollaachi Santhaiyile" (in the film Rojavanam). This was followed by "Parthein Parthein" in the movie Parthein Rasithein. He has rendered most of the songs for Baradwaj. He has sung in the music of the Ilaiyaraaja and also the Oscar award winner A. R. Rahman and the younger music directors of today, Yuvan Shankar Raja, Sri Kanth Deva to Deva, Sirpy and Adidtyan.

Yugendran continues to sing to date, his latest being the song from Goa. He also composes music. He has composed music for Veeramum Eeramum and Balam and he did the re-recording for Aghatiyan's movie Nenjathai Killaathe, starring Vikranth. His latest venture, Nellai Santhippu,  released in 2012.

Acting career 
Yugendran was initially supposed to make his acting debut through Raja Kantheeban's Mouname in 1998, but the project was shelved. Yugendran Vasudevan Nair's debut was in the movie Poovellam Un Vasam opposite Ajith Kumar and Jyothika. He went on to doing more movies with Illaiya Thalapathy Vijay. His latest movie is Yuddham Sei, a Mysskin movie of 2011. He has acted as a hero in 3 movies: Kaiyodu Kai, Ulla Kadathal and Pachai Nirame.

He has acted in TV serials such as Savithree, Kolangal, Megala and Idhayam. He has acted in TV Dramas in countries such as Singapore and Malaysia.

Host 

Yugendran started out hosting Musical programs on Jaya TV and went on to hosting more musical shows on Sun TV and VJ TV. He then was also roped in to host other genre programs, especially reality programs such as Treasure Hunt on Jaya TV and a couples contest show on the same Channel. Recently he has organised online 8 hours music tribute to his father Thiru. Malaysia Vasudevan on 75th Birthday with all renowned singers

TV Producer 

Yugendran started a company called Rambutan Productions in India and Rambutan Media Works in Singapore. He is currently producing programs for India, Singapore, Malaysia and Sri Lanka. He runs the company with his wife, Hayma Malini. He did TV shows in Singapore under Rambutan Media Works, which includes Endrendrum Punnagai (Film Based), Sollathaan Ninaikirain (Talk show), Vidumurai Vasantham (Holiday Variety), Kondaattam (info-ed) and Achamillai Achamillai (Talk show for women by women). Rambutan Media Works is now changed to 23 Frames Pte Ltd. and is currently producing the children's variety series "Vilaiyaattu Pasanga" (https://www.facebook.com/VilayaattuPasanga). He also directed a Reality Game Show on Starhub Varnam Television. He acted in a Singapore Tele-movie Sathurangam, which was telecasted in Singapore on Father's Day 2016 on Vasantham (MediaCorp).

Filmography

As actor

As singer

As music director

References

External links 
 Songs sung by Yugendran

Actor Yugendran Latest Stills Photos

1976 births
Living people
Indian male playback singers
Indian male film actors
Indian people of Malaysian descent
Tamil playback singers
Tamil male actors
Tamil film score composers
Malaysian people of Indian descent
Malaysian people of Malayali descent
Indian male film score composers